Inter se (also styled as inter sese) is a Legal Latin phrase that means "[a]mong or between themselves". The phrase is "used to distinguish rights or duties between two or more parties from their rights or duties to others." For example, "The constitutional documents of a company constitute a contract between the company and its shareholders, and between the shareholders inter se."  In Australian constitutional law, it refers to matters concerning a dispute between the Commonwealth and one or more of the states concerning the extents of their respective powers.

See also
Exclusive right
Social contract

References

Latin legal terminology
Law of Australia